Svend Omar Hermansen (September 14, 1913 – February 16, 1998) was a Danish boxer who competed in the 1936 Summer Olympics. He was born in Ringsted. In 1936 he was eliminated in the second round of the heavyweight class after losing his fight to the upcoming silver medalist Guillermo Lovell.

1936 Olympic results
Below is the record of Omar Hermansen, a Danish heavyweight boxer who competed at the 1936 Berlin Olympics:

 Round of 32: bye
 Round of 16: lost to Guillermo Lovell (Argentina) by decision

References

External links
Omar Hermansen's profile at Sports Reference.com

1913 births
1998 deaths
Heavyweight boxers
Olympic boxers of Denmark
Boxers at the 1936 Summer Olympics
Danish male boxers
People from Ringsted
Sportspeople from Region Zealand